Alexander Douglas Turnbull (August 26, 1903 – June 23, 1993) was an engineer and political figure in British Columbia. He represented Rossland-Trail from 1949 to 1952 as a Liberal.

Born in St. Marys, Ontario in 1903, he was the son of J.W. Turnbull and Elizabeth Moore. Turnbull was educated at the University of Toronto as a metallurgical engineer. In 1928, he married Elsie G. Willard. Turnbull served as reeve of Tadanac from 1944 to 1945. He was a member of a Liberal-Conservative coalition in the assembly. Turnbull was defeated by Robert Edward Sommers when he ran for reelection in 1952. He served in the provincial cabinet as Minister of Health and Welfare, as Minister of Trade and Industry and as Minister of Municipal Affairs. He died in 1993.

References 

1903 births
1993 deaths
British Columbia Liberal Party MLAs